The 2012 JAF Grand Prix Fuji Sprint Cup was the final racing event for both the 2012 Super GT season and the 2012 Formula Nippon season. It took place over November 17 and November 18, 2012.

Background
Due to commitments in the 2012 Guia Race of Macau, André Couto was replaced in the #19 Lexus Team WedsSport Bandoh by Marino Franchitti. In GT300, due to Hideki Yamauchi racing in the 2012 Macau Grand Prix Formula Three, his seat in the #87 JLOC Lamborghini Gallardo was replaced by Yuya Sakamoto, who had competed in five races in the #85 JLOC entry in 2012. The #27 LMP Motorsport Ferrari F430 GTC was the only team that competed at Motegi that did not enter at Fuji, while the #86 JLOC entry returned after last racing in the 2012 41st International Pokka 1000km.

There were no driver changes in Formula Nippon. It was also the last event that the series name Formula Nippon would be used, as for 2013 it will be renamed to the Japanese Championship Super Formula.

Unlike the eight points-scoring races in Super GT, the Fuji Sprint Cup was run under slightly different rules. 
 The GT500 and GT300 classes were split into their own set of two races.
 Each driver in GT500 and GT300 would have their own 22 lap sprint race without any mandatory pitstop.
 Standing starts were also implemented for each of the four races instead of the rolling start normally seen.

East versus West
There was one final intranational competition.  All Japanese drivers, including those in support races, were divided into East and West teams according to the prefectures of their birth; visiting international drivers were randomly assigned to one team by the organizers. The race results of 8 races (4 in Super GT, 1 each in other events), plus bonus points added from sales events outside the circuit would determine the winning team. An extra bonus would be issued to all drivers and supporters on that team.

GT300 Race 1 results
The first GT300 race was held on Saturday November 17.

GT500 Race 1 results
The first GT500 race was held on Saturday November 17. Due to heavy rain, the race was halted after 11 of the scheduled 22 laps.

Formula Nippon results
The Formula Nippon race was held on Sunday November 18.

 – André Lotterer was disqualified post-race due to irregularities with the skid block on his car.

GT300 Race 2 results
The second GT300 race was held on Sunday November 18.

GT500 Race 2 results
The second GT500 race was held on Sunday November 18.

References

 Super GT Race results 
 Formula Nippon Race result 

2012 Super GT season
2012 in Japanese motorsport